Robert Stevens (December 2, 1920 – August 7, 1989) was an American director and producer of television shows and movies during a career of nearly 4 decades.

He was most active throughout the 1950s and 1960s. His most famous and notable works include his works as the producer/director of Suspense, as a frequent director of Alfred Hitchcock Presents and The Alfred Hitchcock Hour and as the director of the movie Change of Mind. He also directed the pilot of The Twilight Zone.

Work became slow for Stevens after the 1970s. His last work was as the director of an episode of Amazing Stories in 1987.

In 1989, Stevens was robbed and beaten in his rented Westport, Connecticut home where he had retired to in 1987. He died shortly thereafter of cardiac arrest on August 7, 1989, in Westport. He was 68 years old.

Filmography

As director

As producer

As writer

References

External links

1920 births
1989 deaths
American television directors